The 2018–19 National League 2 North is the tenth season (32nd overall) of the fourth tier (north) of the English domestic rugby union competitions since the professionalised format of the second division was introduced.  

Hull Ionians finished as champions following a bonus point home victory Leicester Lions on 13 April 2019, which sealed the league title with one round still to go.  It was Ionians third National League 2 North title, equalling the record set by Macclesfield.  It was a competitive league battle, with four teams looking like they could win but in the end Hull Ionians just did enough to claim the title, 4 points ahead of second placed Chester, who qualified for the promotion play-off.  On 4 May 2019, Chester lost 10–19 away to National League 2 South runners up, Canterbury.  That result meant that only Ionians would be promoted from the division, joining the 2019–20 National League 1 after just one season away.  

At the other end of the table, newcomers Peterborough Lions were the first side to be relegated on 9 March 2019, with five games still to play, after they lost at home to Preston Grasshoppers.  A week later a win for Sheffield Tigers on 6 April ensured the Sheffield based clubs safety, whilst condemning both Macclesfield and South Leicester to the drop, despite South Leicester winning their fixture away from home.  Peterborough Lions and South Leicester would drop into Midlands Premier, while Macclesfield would fall to North Premier.

Another interesting fact from the season was the lowest ever recorded attendance in National League 2 North of just 37 who attended South Leicester's home game against Sedgley Park on 30 March 2019.  South Leicester also set an overall low attendance record for the division, averaging just 85 supporters per game.

Structure
The league consists of sixteen teams with all the teams playing each other on a home and away basis to make a total of thirty matches each. There is one automatic promotion place, one play-off place and three relegation places. The champions are promoted to the 2019–20 National League 1 and the runners up play the second-placed team in the 2018–19 National League 2 South with the winner also being promoted.  The last three teams are relegated to either North Premier or Midlands Premier depending on the geographical location of the team (in some cases teams may join the southern regional leagues).

The results of the matches contribute points to the league as follows:
 4 points are awarded for a win
 2 points are awarded for a draw
 0 points are awarded for a loss, however
 1 losing (bonus) point is awarded to a team that loses a match by 7 points or fewer
 1 additional (bonus) point is awarded to a team scoring 4 tries or more in a match.

Participating teams and locations
Twelve of the teams listed below participated in the 2017–18 National League 2 North season.  The 2017–18 champions Sale FC were promoted into the 2018–19 National League 1, replacing Fylde and Hull Ionians who were relegated from the 2017–18 National League 1.  The three teams relegated from National League 2 North the previous season were Sheffield and  Luctonians (both Midlands Premier) and Blaydon (North Premier).   

The promoted teams include Preston Grasshoppers from North Premier (champions) who return to the division after an absence of just one season, while Peterborough Lions came up from Midlands Premier (playoffs).  Midlands Premier champions Birmingham & Solihull were level transferred to the 2018–19 National League 2 South due to an imbalance of teams, being considered the most southerly team in the division.

League table

Fixtures & Results

Round 1

Round 2

Round 3

Round 4

Round 5

Postponed due to MRSA outbreak.  Game to be replayed on 10 November 2018.

Round 6

Round 7

Round 8

Round 9

Round 10

Round 5 (rescheduled game)

Game rescheduled from 29 September 2018.

Round 11

Round 12

Round 13

Round 14

Round 15

Postponed due to adverse travel conditions caused by poor weather (snow).  Game to be rescheduled for 23 February 2019.

Postponed due to poor weather (frozen pitch).  Game to be rescheduled for 23 February 2019.

Round 16

Round 17

Round 18

Round 19

Round 20

Round 21

Postponed due to poor weather (frozen pitch).  Game to be rescheduled for 23 February 2019.

Postponed due to poor weather (frozen pitch).  Game to be rescheduled for 23 February 2019.

Postponed due to poor weather (frozen pitch).  Game to be rescheduled for 16 March 2019.

Postponed due to poor weather (frozen pitch).  Game to be rescheduled for 16 March 2019.

Postponed due to poor weather (frozen pitch).  Game to be rescheduled for 23 February 2019.

Postponed due to poor weather (snow).  Game to be rescheduled for 23 February 2019.

Round 22

Round 23

Rounds 15 & 21 (rescheduled games)

Game rescheduled from 2 February 2019.

Game rescheduled from 2 February 2019.

Game rescheduled from 15 December 2018.

Game rescheduled from 2 February 2019.

Game rescheduled from 2 February 2019.

Game rescheduled from 15 December 2018.

Round 24

Round 25

Peterborough Lions are relegated.

Round 21 (rescheduled games)

Game rescheduled from 2 February 2019.

Game originally rescheduled from 2 February 2019 but postponed (again) to 20 April 2019 due to a waterlogged pitch caused by heavy rain.

Round 26

Round 27

Round 28

South Leicester are relegated.

Macclesfield are relegated.

Round 29

Chester qualify for promotion play-off.

Hull Ionians are champions.

Round 21 (rescheduled game)

Game originally rescheduled from 2 February 2019 and then again from 16 March 2019.

Round 30

Promotion play-off

Each season, the runners-up in the National League 2 North and National League 2 South participate in a play-off for promotion to National League 1.  Canterbury were runners up in the 2018–19 National League 2 South, and because they had a better record than the 2018–19 National League 2 North runners up, Chester, they host the play-off match.

Attendances
 Does not include promotion play-off.

Individual statistics
 Note that points scorers includes tries as well as conversions, penalties and drop goals. Appearance figures also include coming on as substitutes (unused substitutes not included). Does not include promotion play-off.

Top points scorers

Top try scorers

Season records

Team
Largest home win — 67 points
91 – 24 Huddersfield at home to	South Leicester on 23 March 2019 
Largest away win — 47 points
59 – 12 Fylde away to South Leicester on 9 March 2019
Most points scored — 91 points
91 – 24 Huddersfield at home to	South Leicester on 23 March 2019 
Most tries in a match — 13
Huddersfield at home to	South Leicester on 23 March 2019 
Most conversions in a match — 13
Huddersfield at home to South Leicester on 23 March 2019
Most penalties in a match — 6
Sheffield Tigers away to Fylde on 29 September 2018
Most drop goals in a match — 1 (8)
Hull Ionians at home to Peterborough Lions on 15 September 2018
Hull Ionians at home to Macclesfield on 8 December 2018
Huddersfield away to Preston Grasshoppers on 5 January 2019
Huddersfield away to Hinckley on 16 February 2019
Huddersfield at home to Wharfedale on 23 February 2019
Preston Grasshoppers at home to Tynedale on 2 March 2019
Stourbridge away to Preston Grasshoppers on 6 April 2019
Huddersfield away to Sedgley Park on 27 April 2019

Attendances
Highest — 1,794
Fylde at home to Preston Grasshoppers on 22 December 2018
Lowest — 37
South Leicester at home to Sedgley Park on 30 March 2019
Highest average attendance — 610
Fylde
Lowest average attendance — 85
South Leicester

Player
Most points in a match — 36
 Chris Johnson for Huddersfield at home to South Leicester on 23 March 2019
Most tries in a match — 4 (6)
 Jamie Broadley for Sheffield Tigers at home to Macclesfield on 3 November 2018
 Callum Dacey for Hinckley at home to Chester on 23 February 2019
 David Rundle for Stourbridge at home to Huddersfield on 9 March 2019
 Myles Hall for Macclesfield at home to Peterborough Lions on 23 March 2019
 Kian Stewart for Huddersfield at home to South Leicester on 23 March 2019
 Henri Packard for Sheffield Tigers at home to Peterborough Lions on 6 April 2019
Most conversions in a match — 13
 Chris Johnson for Huddersfield at home to South Leicester on 23 March 2019
Most penalties in a match — 6
 Mark Ireland for Sheffield Tigers away to Fylde on 29 September 2018
Most drop goals in a match — 1 (8)
 Sam Crane for Hull Ionians at home to Peterborough Lions on 15 September 2018
 Morgan Bunting for Hull Ionians at home to Macclesfield on 8 December 2018
 Chris Johnson for Huddersfield away to Preston Grasshoppers on 5 January 2019
 Chris Johnson for Huddersfield away to Hinckley on 16 February 2019
 Chris Johnson for Huddersfield at home to Wharfedale on 23 February 2019
 Thomas Davidson for Preston Grasshoppers at home to Tynedale on 2 March 2019
 Chris Scott for Stourbridge away to Preston Grasshoppers on 6 April 2019
 Chris Johnson for Huddersfield away to Sedgley Park on 27 April 2019

Notes

See also
 English rugby union system
 Rugby union in England

References

External links
 NCA Rugby

2018–19
4N